Hans Volckmar (October 6, 1900 – ??) was an Austrian bobsledder who competed in the mid-1930s. He finished 19th in the two-man event at the 1936 Winter Olympics in Garmisch-Partenkirchen.

References
1936 bobsleigh two-man results
Hans Volckmar's profile at Sports Reference.com

Austrian male bobsledders
Bobsledders at the 1936 Winter Olympics
1900 births
Year of death missing